Nikephoros Dokeianos (died 1040) was the catepan of Italy from 1039 until 1040. He saw the early rebellion of Arduin the Lombard, but not its completion. He was killed at  Ascoli Satriano  early in 1040. With his death, the insurrection accelerated.

Sources
Chalandon, Ferdinand. Histoire de la domination normande en Italie et en Sicile. Paris, 1907.

1040 deaths
11th-century catepans of Italy
Assassinated military personnel
Year of birth unknown